Dhat may refer to:

Dhat syndrome is a condition found in the Indian subcontinent in male patients. 
Dhat al-Hajj is an archaeological site in the Tabuk Province of Saudi Arabia.
Dhat-Badan was the nature goddess of ancient Yemen and Ethiopia.
Dhat al-Riqa is a location in Saudi Arabia.
Dhat (Ludhiana West) is a village located in the Ludhiana West tehsil, of Ludhiana district, Punjab.